Robert Gauvin is a Canadian politician who was elected to the Legislative Assembly of New Brunswick in the 2018 New Brunswick general election. He currently represents the riding of Shediac Bay-Dieppe as a member of the New Brunswick Liberal Association.

Political career

Gauvin was first elected in the 2018 election as the Progressive Conservative MLA for Shippagan-Lamèque-Miscou. The Progressive Conservatives formed a minority government after the election, at which point Blaine Higgs appointed Gauvin to the Executive Council of New Brunswick as Deputy Premier, Minister of Tourism, Heritage, and Culture, and Minister responsible for La Francophonie.

On February 14, 2020, he resigned from cabinet and the Progressive Conservative caucus to sit as an Independent MLA, citing Higgs' health reforms, including the nighttime closure of six hospital emergency rooms; in announcing his resignation, Gauvin called those reforms "an attack on rural New Brunswick."

On August 18, 2020, ahead of the 2020 election, he announced he was joining the Liberal Party and would run as their in Shediac Bay-Dieppe, a riding previously represented by former Liberal Premier Brian Gallant. He was re-elected in 2020, in which Higgs' Progressive Conservatives won a majority government.

On January 30, 2022, Gauvin announced his campaign for leader of the New Brunswick Liberal Association following Kevin Vickers' 2020 resignation. The election took place on August 6, 2022, and Gauvin was eliminated on the second round of balloting, finishing third in the contest.

Gauvin is the son of former New Brunswick MLA Jean Gauvin.

Electoral history

References

1968 births
Living people
Acadian people
Deputy premiers of New Brunswick
Members of the Executive Council of New Brunswick
People from Caraquet
Progressive Conservative Party of New Brunswick MLAs
21st-century Canadian politicians
New Brunswick Liberal Association MLAs